Molde Fotballklubb Women is the women's team in Norwegian football club Molde FK from Molde that currently plays in the 2. divisjon, the Norwegian third tier. Founded on 19 June 1911, Molde was originally known as International. Their most recent appearance in Toppserien, the top flight of Norwegian women's football, was during the 1994 season. Molde FK Women did not compete in 2003 and 2008 due to lack of players.

Since the start of the 2020 season, the current head coach is August Nyland.

Molde won the 3. divisjon (Sunnmøre) in 2014 and were promoted to the 2015 2. divisjon. The team has finished in a top four position in all four seasons after the promotion. Former Molde player Morten Kristiansen was head coach in the seasons 2018 and 2019.

Stadium

Currently, Molde play their home matches at Aker Stadion or Reknesbanen. Molde's main stadium is the Aker Stadion, formerly known as Molde Stadion, located at Reknes, by the seashore of central Molde. The  cost was mostly paid for by investor Kjell Inge Røkke, after whom the ground has been nicknamed "Røkkeløkka". The official name of the new stadium was Molde Stadion until 3 May 2006, when the stadium name changed to Aker Stadion following a sponsorship deal with Røkke's company Aker. The stadium was inaugurated on 18 April 1998, when the stadium was officially opened by Prime Minister and Molde fan Kjell Magne Bondevik. Molde FK Women did not play at Aker Stadion until 2014, when the turf was changed from natural grass to an artificial turf. Their first game on Aker Stadion was the 5−0 win against Brattvåg on 30 April 2014.

At dates when Aker Stadion is unavailable, Molde play their home matches at Reknesbanen, located 750 metres north of Aker Stadion, which is the home arena of Træff.

Players

Current squad

Club officials

Club directors

Coaching staff

Recent history

Coaches
Per Lianes (2002)
Birgitta Sekkeseter (2004)
Roald Blakseth (2005)
Unknown (2006–2011)
Jørund Svensli (2012–2017)
Morten Kristiansen (2018–2019)
August Nyland (2020–)

History of league positions

References

External links 
Molde F.K.
MFKWeb – Frequently updated independent supporter site
Tornekrattet supporter club — formerly official, now independent

 
Molde
Sport in Molde